Nicholas Tucker (born August 26, 1985) is an American professional stock car racing driver and team owner. He currently owns Trans-Am Series team Nitro Motorsports and as a driver most recently competed in the World of Outlaws NOS Energy Drink Sprint Car Series in 2021.

Career
Tucker began racing at age five, starting out by racing flat track four-wheelers and go-karts. At age 14, he came to the point where he had to move up to racing late models to advance his career. However, because of Washington state regulations, he could not compete in those cars in his home state. As a result, he and his family moved to North Carolina in the Charlotte metropolitan area where most NASCAR teams are located, where he began to race those cars there.

Tucker was a late entry to the 2009 rookie of the year class in the Truck Series. Joining the new GunBroker Racing team to drive their No. 21 Dodge, he drove nearly the entire season starting at the Michigan race. (The only race he did not run was Talladega, with Sean Murphy in the truck instead.) Unfortunately, Tucker had to start-and-park in almost all of those starts due to lack of sponsorship and the team's focus on fielding their primary truck, the No. 23, driven by Jason White. The only race he was running at the finish of was the season-finale at Homestead, where the team found sponsorship from the Denny Hamlin Foundation and ran the whole race. Tucker finished five laps down in 26th in what would turn out to be his final start in the Truck Series.

Tucker served as a crew chief for Carter 2 Motorsports in the ARCA Series in 2012, but gave up that role for three races (Salem, Elko, and the first Pocono race) to be a driver for the team in them. At the first two of those races, Tucker drove C2M's No. 40, and for Pocono, he was in the No. 97. His cars were sponsored by Ron Paul's Republican presidential campaign that year.

After his time driving in NASCAR and ARCA, Tucker returned to the go-kart racing industry and founded a cadet karting race team called Nitro Kart in 2016 to help up-and-coming go-kart drivers move up the racing ladder.

Motorsports career results

NASCAR
(key) (Bold – Pole position awarded by qualifying time. Italics – Pole position earned by points standings or practice time. * – Most laps led.)

Nationwide Series

 Season still in progress
 Ineligible for series points

Camping World Truck Series

ARCA Racing Series
(key) (Bold – Pole position awarded by qualifying time. Italics – Pole position earned by points standings or practice time. * – Most laps led.)

References

External links
 

1985 births
NASCAR drivers
Living people
Racing drivers from Washington (state)
ARCA Menards Series drivers
People from Bremerton, Washington
CARS Tour drivers
Cope family